Coptorhynchus elegans is a species of weevils in the tribe Celeuthetini. It is found in Indonesia (Borneo, Maluku).

References

External links 

 
 Coptorhynchus elegans at insectoid.info

Entiminae
Beetles described in 1900